Bromates is a 2022 American buddy comedy film directed by Court Crandall and starring Josh Brener and Lil Rel Howery.  Snoop Dogg serves as an executive producer of the film.

Plot
Longtime best friends Sid and Jonesie are dumped by their respective girlfriends. Both without a living situation, they decide to become "bromates", bros who are roommates, which puts their relationship to the ultimate test.

Cast
Josh Brener as Sid
Lil Rel Howery as Jonesie
Asif Ali as Angry Mike
Brendan Scannell as Runway Dave
Taryn Manning as Darlene
Jessica Lowe as Sadie
Marla Gibbs
Flula Borg as Clos
Ken Davitian as Kaloosh
Rob Riggle
Snoop Dogg as himself
Parvesh Cheena as Raj
Jamie Brewer

Release
In August 2022, it was announced that Quiver Distribution acquired worldwide rights to the film, which was released theatrically and on video on demand on October 7, 2022.

The film premiered at the Boston Film Festival on September 23, 2022.

Reception
The film has a 0% rating on Rotten Tomatoes based on five reviews.

Brittany Witherspoon of Screen Rant awarded the film two stars out of five and wrote, "There’s an enormous effort to entertain, but Bromates runs out of ideas faster than it can provide organic laughs."

Julian Roman of MovieWeb gave the film a negative review and wrote, "The film is actually funny with several stand-out scenes. The ensemble cast of famous comedians keep the laughs flowing. The problem is that Bromates runs out of narrative steam. It's more like a collection of skits than a cohesive story."

References

External links
 

2022 comedy films
2020s American films
2020s buddy comedy films
2020s English-language films
American buddy comedy films
Quiver Distribution films